Syvde Church is a parish church of the Church of Norway in the municipality of Vanylven in Møre og Romsdal county, Norway. It is located in the village of Myklebost in the Syvde area of the municipality. It is the church for the Syvde parish which is part of the Søre Sunnmøre prosti (deanery) in the Diocese of Møre. The white, wooden church was built in a long church design in 1837 using plans drawn up by an unknown architect. The church seats about 392 people.

History
The earliest existing historical records of the church date back to 1432 in Aslak Bolt's cadastre, but the church was already existing at that time. The first church in Syvde was likely a wooden stave church that was possibly built in the 14th century. The oldest written sources that describe the church building say that the small, old stave church had a rectangular nave with a choir on the south end and a church porch on the west end. In 1677, the old pulpit from the old Ulstein Church was moved to this church and installed in it.

The church sat on the plains at the bottom of a river valley and sometimes the river would flood and much of the valley would be submerged during these brief periods of occasional flooding. Because of this, the church site was not ideal. In the 1830s, the church was in poor shape and in need of replacement. The parish decided to not only build a new church, but also to move the church site a different location, near the fjord and further from the river. In 1836, the old church was torn down and its materials were sold to a private individual. The new church was consecrated by the rector on 13 November 1837, having been postponed by one day due to bad weather.

In 1870-1871, the church was renovated and enlarged. A new roof was installed at a higher level, about  higher than the previous roof. After lengthening the nave, a new church porch and tower were built on the west end of the church. This renovation gave the church its characteristic look with its three main doors to the building. During the 1950s, the sacristy was enlarged on the east end of the building.

See also
List of churches in Møre

References

Vanylven
Churches in Møre og Romsdal
Long churches in Norway
Wooden churches in Norway
19th-century Church of Norway church buildings
Churches completed in 1837
14th-century establishments in Norway